Harold Hess Lustron House is located in Closter, Bergen County, New Jersey, United States. The house was built in 1950 and was added to the National Register of Historic Places on July 25, 2000. it is a Lustron house.
After threat of destruction the house was deeded to the town of Closter.

See also
National Register of Historic Places listings in Bergen County, New Jersey
William A. Wittmer Lustron House
List of Lustron houses

References

Closter, New Jersey
Houses on the National Register of Historic Places in New Jersey
Houses completed in 1950
Houses in Bergen County, New Jersey
Lustron houses
National Register of Historic Places in Bergen County, New Jersey
New Jersey Register of Historic Places
1950 establishments in New Jersey